Nandgaon may refer to:
 Nandgaon Khandeshwar, town and a tehsil in Amravati subdivision, Maharashtra, India
 Nandgaon, Maharashtra, a town in Nashik district of Maharashtra, India
 Nandgaon (Vidhan Sabha constituency), one of the fifteen constituencies of Maharashtra Vidhan Sabha
 Nandgaon, Mawal, a village in Pune district  of Maharashtra, India
 Nandgaon, Uttar Pradesh, a village in Mathura district of Uttar Pradesh, India
 Rajnandgaon, also known as Rajnandgaon or Nandgaon, a town in the,
Rajnandgaon district in Chhattisgarh state of central India 
Nandgaon State, a former princely state in central India
Nandgaon, Jalgaon